Nomindsland is the debut album by the industrial metal band Red Harvest, released through Black Mark Production in 1992. It is notable for being their only release that could be described as thrash metal, before the band moved towards industrial metal.

Track listing

Personnel
Red Harvest
 Jimmy Bergsten - vocals, guitar
 Jan F. Nygård	guitar
 Thomas Brandt - bass
 Cato Bekkevold - drums

Production
 Kaj Goritzka - photography (cover art)
 Bjørn Opsahl - photography
 Tom "SM" Hansen - engineering
 Kai Andersen - mixing
 Dag Kjelsaas - photography (cover art)

External links
 Red Harvest's official website

1992 albums
Red Harvest (band) albums